Comeback is the fourth and final studio album by German all-female pop-rap band Tic Tac Toe, released in 2006 by A One Entertainment. The album was their first in nearly a decade recorded in the original line-up, after Ricarda "Ricky" Wältken had re-joined the band.

The album was preceded by the single "Spiegel" in 2005 which became a top 10 hit in German-speaking countries. However, the second and final single, "Keine Ahnung", was a commercial failure and did not enter any charts. The album itself was a moderate top 40 chart success.

Track listing

Charts

References 

2006 albums
German-language albums
Tic Tac Toe (band) albums